Dumitru Beţiu (born 1958) is a Romanian sprint canoer who competed in the mid to late 1980s. He won two medals at the ICF Canoe Sprint World Championships with a silver (C-2 10000 m: 1986) and a bronze (C-2 500 m: 1983).

References

Living people
Romanian male canoeists
1958 births
ICF Canoe Sprint World Championships medalists in Canadian